The men's triple jump at the 2018 IAAF World Indoor Championships took place on 3 March 2018.

Summary
The fifteen athletes went directly to final.  Veteran Nelson Évora was the only one to jump beyond 17 metres in the first round, his 17.14m taking the lead.  Alexis Copello took the lead temporarily in the second round with a 17.17, surpassed near the end of the round by Almir dos Santos' 17.22m.  Defending champion, Dong Bin's 16.84m in the round barely got him into the finals, but it was his best of the day.  Returning silver medalist Max Heß didn't make the finals, hie only mark at 16.47m in the third round.  At the end of that round, Évora improved upon his own ten year old national record with a 17.40m to take back the lead.  After the preliminary rounds, two time Olympic silver medalist Will Claye found himself in fifth place.  On his fourth attempt, he rectified that by jumping the  winner.  In the fifth round, dos Santos got off a 17.41m to squeeze ahead of Évora to take second position.

Results
The final was started at 19:08.

References

Triple jump
Triple jump at the World Athletics Indoor Championships
2018 in men's athletics